Charles Carlton Maxwell (December 28, 1913 – August 7, 1993) was an American character actor and producer who worked primarily in television.

Biography
Maxwell frequently appeared as a guest star in western television series, including  Bonanza, Gunsmoke, Lawman, Rawhide, and The Rifleman. In 1959, he was cast as General Phil Sheridan in the episode "One Bullet from Broken Bow" of the NBC western series, Bat Masterson, starring Gene Barry in the title role. He appeared again later that year as crooked hotel owner “Ron Davis” in the episode “Lady Luck”. He also appeared  on NBC's Bonanza ten times as entirely different characters.

In the 1960s Maxwell began appearing in a variety of guest roles. For example, he appeared in My Favorite Martian (first season, episode 23) as Jakobar in "An Old Friend of the Family".
He was a regular on the short-lived series The Hank McCune Show and appeared as Corp. Giles on the World War II drama Combat! in the episode "Ask Me No Questions" in 1966. He also appeared as Virgil Earp in the Star Trek episode “Spectre of the Gun” in 1968.

He had his longest running role as the unseen, uncredited radio announcer on numerous episodes of Gilligan's Island.

Filmography

External links
 

American male television actors
People from Long Island
Male actors from New York (state)
1913 births
1993 deaths
20th-century American male actors